Nagy-Milic is the highest peak of the Hungarian part of the Zemplén Mountains, which is part of the Carpathian Mountains. The mountain is situated on the border of Hungary and Slovakia. It is 894 metres tall and is near the northernmost point of Hungary.

Etymology
The name comes from a Slavic personal name derived from milъ (dear), e.g. Milic, Milica frequently used in Slavic place names.   Mylychkw (Milic's stone?, 1270).

References

Mountains of Hungary
Mountains of Slovakia
International mountains of Europe
Hungary–Slovakia border
Geography of Borsod-Abaúj-Zemplén County
Mountains of the Western Carpathians